Rise of the Infidels is the third and final album by crossover thrash band Stormtroopers of Death. The album was released in August 2007 on the Nuclear Blast label. The album is described as an "extended EP", with a running time close to an hour. According to singer Milano the album will "finally be the last of S.O.D.".

The EP contains four new tracks: "Stand Up and Fight", "Java Amigo", "United and Strong" and "Ready to Fight". Three of these tracks had been released previously: "Stand Up and Fight" (under the title "Pathmark Song") and "Java Amigo" were both on the New York's Hardest Vol. 3 compilation released in 2001, and "United and Strong" appears on the Japanese version of Live At Budokan. "Ready To Fight" is a Negative Approach cover, and "United and Strong" is an Agnostic Front cover.

Track listing

Tracks 5-24 recorded live at the Fenix, Seattle, WA.

Credits
Billy Milano – vocals
Scott Ian – guitars, vocals
Dan Lilker – bass, vocals
Charlie Benante – drums

References

Stormtroopers of Death albums
2007 albums
Nuclear Blast albums